Thabiso Mchunu (born 4 March 1988) is a South African professional boxer. He has challenged twice for a world title; first in 2016 for the WBO cruiserweight title. In 2022, he challenged for the WBC cruiserweight title. As of August, 2022, Mchunu is ranked as the world's fifth best cruiserweight according to The Ring, BoxRec and TBRB.

Professional boxing career

Early career
Mchunu made his professional debut against Mzikayise Hlengwa on 28 July 2008 in Durban, South Africa. He won the fight on points after four rounds. After amassing a 3-0 record, Mchunu was booked to face Patrick Madzinga for the vacant South African cruiserweight title on 29 February 2008. He won the vacant title by a ninth-round technical knockout. Mchunu was scheduled to make his first title defense against Sean Santana on 11 July 2008. Santana retired from the fight at the end of the sixth round. After successfully making his first South African title defense, Mchunu was booked to fight Marciano Commey for the vacant WBA Pan African cruiserweight title on 10 October 2008 in Bloemfontein, South Africa. He won the fight by a first-round knockout. He made two more South African title defenses against Ruben Groenewald on 22 January 2009 and Daniel Bruwer on 5 November 2010, as well as a joint South African and Pan African title defense against Soon Botes on 15 May 2009.

After successfully beating Danie Venter by majority decision on 4 June 2011, Mchunu faced his first step-up in competition as he was booked to fight the 10-2 Zack Mwekassa on 24 October 2011, in Kempton Park, Gauteng. Mwekassa won the fight by a sixth-round technical knockout.

First cruiserweight title run

South African champion
Mchunu faced Danie Venter for the vacant African cruiserweight title on 10 November 2012. He won the fight by a fifth-round knockout. Venter was knocked down three times by the 1:52 minute mark, which forced the referee to stop the fight. Mchunu made his United States debut against Eddie Chambers on 3 August 2013, as the fight took place at the Mohegan Sun Arena in Montville, Connecticut. Mchunu won the fight by unanimous decision, with scores of 99-91, 99-91 and 99-93.

Mchunu was booked to face the 17-1 Olanrewaju Durodola for the vacant WBC–NABF cruiserweight title on 24 January 2014. He won the fight by unanimous decision, with scores of 98-91, 96-93 and 97-92. Mchunu made his first WBC-NABF title defense against Garrett Wilson on 20 September 2014. He won the fight by unanimous decision, with scores of 99-90, 96-93 and 98-91.

Mchunu returned to South Africa for his next bout, as he was booked to face Ilunga Makabu in a twelve-round WBC cruiserweight title eliminator bout on 16 May 2015 at the Convention Centre in KwaZulu-Natal, South Africa. Makabu won the fight by an eleventh-round knockout. Mchunu was leading slightly on the scorecards at the time of the stoppage, with scores of 96-95, 95-95 and 97-94. After suffering the second professional loss of his career, Mchunu was scheduled to face Boniface Kabore for the vacant WBA interim Pan African cruiserweight title on 20 May 2016 at the Convention Centre in KwaZulu-Natal, South Africa.

Mchunu vs. Usyk
Mchunu challenged the reigning WBO cruiserweight champion Oleksandr Usyk on the Bernard Hopkins vs. Joe Smith Jr. undercard on 17 December 2016. The bout took place at The Forum in Inglewood, California. The fight started out slow, causing the fans in attendance to boo with displeasure. The pace picked up after the first couple of rounds when Usyk began breaking down Mchunu, before knocking him out in the ninth round. Mchunu was outlanded 163 to 76 in total punches.

Mixed fortunes
Following the third loss of his professional career, Mchunu was scheduled to face Johnny Muller for the vacant African and South African cruiserweight titles on 10 June 2017. He thoroughly dominated Muller en-route to a unanimous decision victory, with all three judges awarding Mchunu a 120-108 scorecard. After he bounced back from his loss to Usyk, Mchunu was booked to challenge the WBC International and Continental Americas cruiserweight champion Constantin Bejenaru on 25 November 2017. Mchunu lost the fight by unanimous decision, with scores of 98-91, 97-92 and 97-92. Bejenaru dropped Mchunu with a left cross in the seventh round, but was unable to finish him.

Seven months later, Mchunu was booked to face Ričards Bolotņiks on 23 June 2018, in his return to South Africa, after losing both of his previous United States bouts. He won the fight by sixth-round technical knockout. Mchunu was next scheduled to fight Thomas Oosthuizen for the vacant African cruiserweight title on 1 November 2018. Despite coming into the fight as a favorite, Mchunu ended up losing the fight by majority decision. The two fought an immediate rematch on 8 December 2018, with his South African cruiserweight and Oosthuizen's African cruiserweight titles being on the line. Mchunu won the fight by unanimous decision, with scores of 118-111, 119-111 and 119-109.

Second cruiserweight title run

WBC Silver cruiserweight champion

Mchunu vs. Shihepo 
Mchunu faced the 36-fight veteran Willbeforce Shihepo on 20 October 2019, at the Time Square in Menlyn, South Africa. Shihepo retired from the bout at the end of the third round, thus awarding Mchunu a stoppage victory. Shihepo gave a surprising reason for his retirement from the fight however, stating: "I am hungry, I have no energy because I never had anything to eat".

Mchunu vs. Lebedev 
Mchunu faced the former unified cruiserweight champion Denis Lebedev for the vacant WBC Silver cruiserweight title on 21 December 2019, at the Ivan Yarygin Sports Palace in Krasnoyarsk, Russia. The 40-year-old Lebedev had announced his retirement in July of the same year, but came out of it to fight Mchunu. His previous fight took place on November 24, 2018. Lebedev was ranked #9 by the WBC at cruiserweight. Mchunu won the fight by a wide unanimous decision, with scores of 119-108, 120-107 and 115-112. Lebedev subsequently announced his second retirement from the sport.

Mchunu vs. Tishchenko 
Mchunu made his first WBC Silver title defense against the 2016 Olympic gold medalist Evgeny Tishchenko on 27 March 2021, at the RCC Boxing Academy in Yekaterinburg, Russia, in what was the WBC cruiserweight title eliminator as well. He won the fight by unanimous decision, with scores of 117-111, 117-111 and 119-109. By beating Tishchenko, Mchunu earned the status of mandatory challenger to the reigning WBC champion Ilunga Makabu, who handed Mchunu his second professional loss.

Mchunu vs. Makabu
Mchunu is scheduled to make his second world title challenge against the reigning WBC cruiserweight champion Ilunga Makabu on January 29, 2022, at the Packard Music Hall in Warren, Ohio. Makabu was ranked as the #2 cruiserweight in the world by The Ring magazine. The bout was independently broadcast on Fite TV by Don King promotions. Makabu won the fight by split decision. Two of the judge scored the bout in his favor (115–113 and 116–112), while the third judge scored it 115–113 for Mchunu. Many news outlets disagreed with the decision, as they had scored it in favor of Mchunu.

Later career
On January 31, 2023, Mchunu was ordered by the WBC to face the former light heavyweight world champion Sergey Kovalev in a cruiserweight semifinal eliminator.

Professional boxing record

References

External links 
 
 Thabiso Mchunu - Profile, News Archive & Current Rankings at Box.Live

1988 births
Living people
Cruiserweight boxers
South African male boxers
African Boxing Union champions
Southpaw boxers
People from eThekwini Metropolitan Municipality